The Canberra Region Rugby League competition is more commonly known as the Canberra Raiders Cup, covering the Australian Capital Territory and surrounding New South Wales towns Queanbeyan, Goulburn and Yass. The competition is run under the auspices of the Country Rugby League and players are eligible for selection in the Canberra Division of the CRL Tier 1 Divisional Championships. The Canberra district competition has an under 19s, reserve and first grade competitions.

History
After the establishment of Rugby League in Sydney in 1909, the game slowly made its way south, reaching the Canberra District in the late 1910s. During those years and into the 1920s and 30s Challenge Cup football was the most popular form of competition, with a cup being donated as a prize for a game between 2 teams. The winning team would then have to defend the cup against all challengers. The most notable Challenge Cups in the Canberra region at the time were the Massey and Carr Cups which began in 1930 and 1933 respectively.

The first organised round robin competition was run in 1928 by Federal Capital Territory and District Rugby League. The winners of inaugural competition were the Acton Rovers and the next four years saw four different winners. The competition ran through until 1937 when interest in League began to dwindle.

The Group 8 Premiership began in 1932 and was strong enough to continue while interest in the game waned. Teams from Canberra, Yass, Queanbeyan and Goulburn competed for the title of premiers up until 1941, when all League competitions in the region were suspended due to the war. Competition resumed in 1946, with the Massey and Carr Cups only lasting the one season before being retired, while the Group 8 Premiership continued on strongly and was duly supported by ACT District Rugby League who ran a second division competition.

Some of the teams to compete during this period included Captains Flat, Crookwell, Braidwood, Goulburn Workers, Goulburn United, Queanbeyan and Yass in the Group 8 Competition while in the ACTDRL Second Division competition there were teams such as Ainslie, Causeway, Eastlake, Hall, R.A.A.F, R.M.C, South City and West City.

It was through the Second Division competition that the Molonglo Shield was established, first being played for in 1964 with Harman/NAVY taking out the inaugural title over the Canberra Rovers.

In 1967 Group 8 joined with part of Group 9 to form Group 8/9 or Zone 2. This was due to a CRL boundaries dispute in the Riverina, and saw Harden, Young and Wyangala Dam join the district competition. The Zone 2 format lasted until 1970 when CRL returned the boundaries in the Riverina to their original positions and Group 8 was restored.

In 1974 CRL officially recognised the Molonglo Shield as its own competition and gave it a Group number, Group 19. It was at this point in time that both Group 8 and Group 19 were strong enough to run first and second division competitions. The first division clubs ran firsts, reserves and Under 18's while the second division sides ran just one team.

Group 8 First Division consisted mainly of the teams which play Canberra Raiders Cup today, with the addition of Crookwell and Goulburn United. Group 8 Second Division was primarily for towns from around the Goulburn District including Taralga, Marulan, Bigga and Argyle. Braidwood also fielded a side in the competition.

Group 19 First Division comprised teams from around Canberra including Kambah, South Woden, Belconnen United and North Canberra. Batemans Bay also competed in Group 19 until 1977. Second Division was much like George Tooke Shield is today, with teams from Harman, Bungendore, Weston Creek and Captains Flat all competing for the title.

In 1980 Group 19 changed its name to ACTRL while in 1981 Group 8 changed to CDRL. In 1982 CDRL was granted entry into the NSWRL as the Canberra Raiders so the ACTRL took over the running of senior league in the district, combining the two groups to form 3 new competitions. The premier division still played for the Molonglo Shield, while the second division competition was split into North and South according to location within the District. In 1986 the two second division competitions were merged to form the Canberra Cup, which ran through until 1998.

In the meantime, a move by regional towns saw the establishment of the George Tooke Shield in 1995, which was aimed at clubs that wished to field firsts and under 18s but were not competitive enough for Molonglo Shield. In its first year 5 teams competed: East Canberra, Braidwood, Yass, Crookwell and Goulburn Exchange. While the Under 18s side of the competition only lasted 2 years, the George Tooke Shield has continued to expand, 9 clubs now competing for the title.

In 1998, after 35 years, the Molonglo Shield was retired and the Canberra Raiders Cup became the prize the first grade clubs competed for over a season. It is still that way today and the Shield still has its place in the game, awarded to the First Grade Minor Premiers.

Clubs

2022 Senior Clubs

First Grade

Second Division (George Tooke Shield)

Former Clubs

First Grade Grand Finals 

 * = Joint Premiers

Team performance

Reserve Grade Grand Finals

Team performance

Under 18/19s Grand Final

Team performance

Ladies League Tag Grand Finals

Team performance

Women's Tackle Grand Finals

Team performance

McIntyre Medal Winners (First Grade Player of the Year)

Award Winners

Multiple Winners

Seasons 
2016 Canberra Rugby League
2017 Canberra Rugby League
2018 Canberra Rugby League
2019 Canberra Rugby League
2020 Canberra Rugby League
2021 Canberra Rugby League

Historic Competitions

Group 8 Second Division/Crookwell RL

Clubs 

 Argyle 
 Bigga
 Binda
 Braidwood 
 Grabben Gullen
 Gunning
 Laggan
 Marulan
 Taralga

See Also 

 George Tooke Shield

References

External links
 
 Canberra Raiders Cup page on the Canberra Raiders official site

Rugby league in the Australian Capital Territory
Recurring sporting events established in 1982
1982 establishments in Australia
Sports leagues established in 1982
Canberra Raiders